Adriaan Mansveld (14 July 1944 – 5 December 1991) was a Dutch footballer who played as a libero.

Career
Born in The Hague, Mansveld played club football for FC Den Haag, Golden Gate Gales, Feyenoord and FC Utrecht. A stand at Zuiderpark Stadion, ADO Den Haag's stadium, was named after Mansveld. At ADO Den Haag's new stadium, the Cars Jeans Stadium, a statue of Mansveld was also erected.

He also earned 6 caps for the Netherlands national team between 1972 and 1973. He played in a number of qualifying matches for the 1974 FIFA World Cup, but was injured for the actual tournament.

He died at the age of 47 from cancer.

References

1944 births
1991 deaths
Footballers from The Hague
Dutch footballers
Netherlands international footballers
ADO Den Haag players
San Francisco Golden Gate Gales players
Feyenoord players
FC Utrecht players
Eredivisie players
United Soccer Association players
Association football defenders
Dutch expatriate footballers
Dutch expatriate sportspeople in the United States
Expatriate soccer players in the United States